Hal Havins is an American actor known for his roles in horror films such as Night of the Demons and Sorority Babes in the Slimeball Bowl-O-Rama.

Select filmography

Film
 1988 Sorority Babes in the Slimeball Bowl-O-Rama as Jimmie
 1988 Night of the Demons as "Stooge"
 1988 Blueberry Hill as Gas Station Attendant
 1989 Witchtrap as Elwin
 1990 Welcome Home, Roxy Carmichael as Raymond Emirts
 1996 Hard Time as Tony
 1999 Life as Billy
 2006 Kill Your Darlings as Bud
 2010 Drop Dead Gorgeous as Billy Dea

Television
 1986 Blue de Ville (TV film) as "Shoe"
 1988 The Return of Desperado (TV film) as Fletch
 1988 ALF (2 episodes) as Officer Gaffney
 1991 Line of Fire: The Morris Dees Story (TV film) as Teddy Kysar
 1995 MADtv (4 episodes) as Various Roles
 2007 The Line-Up (TV film) as Chris
 2017 Fear the Walking Dead (2 episodes) as Bob, The Rancher

References

External links
 

Living people
Male film actors
Male television actors
Year of birth missing (living people)